Mohammad Shafi Abbasi Qureshi (24 November 1928 – 28 August 2016) was an Indian politician and statesman from Kashmir and the founder of the Congress Party in the Indian state of Jammu and Kashmir.

Life
He was born on 24 November 1928 in Kashmir to contractor Haji Mohammad Amin Abbasi who was the first transporter of Union Council Birote, near Kohala Bridge District Abbottabad, Pakistan before 1947. He studied in Tyndale Biscoe School. He has served in various capacities in his long and very active political career. He was elected to Rajya Sabha from Jammu and Kashmir in 1965 and later elected to Lok Sabha from Anantnag in 1971 and 1977 elections. He was the Union Deputy Minister of Commerce from 28 January 1966 to 14 February 1969, Union Deputy Minister for Steel & Heavy Engineering from 15 February 1969 to 2 May 1971, Union Deputy Minister for Railways from 10 October 1974 to March 1977, Minister of Tourism & Civil Aviation (31 July 1979). He held the post of Governor of Bihar on 19 March 1991 to 13 August 1993 and was sworn in as Governor of Madhya Pradesh on 24 June '93, sworn in as Governor of Uttar Pradesh on 3 May 1996 to 19 July 1996.

He was the secretary of the Faculty of Law, Aligarh Muslim University in the year 1953.

He was the Chairperson of the National Commission for Minorities from 3 September 2007 with the rank of Cabinet Minister until Wajahat Habibullah took over.

He died on 28 August 2016 in Delhi's Batra hospital. Jammu and Kashmir's chief minister Mehbooba Mufti, Governor N. N. Vohra condoled his death.

References

1928 births
2016 deaths
Kashmiri people
Jammu and Kashmir politicians
Indian Muslims
Governors of Bihar
Governors of Madhya Pradesh
Governors of Uttar Pradesh
People from Srinagar
Aligarh Muslim University
Rajya Sabha members from Jammu and Kashmir
Lok Sabha members from Jammu and Kashmir
People from Anantnag district
India MPs 1967–1970
India MPs 1971–1977
India MPs 1977–1979
Tourism ministers of India
Civil aviation ministers of India
Members of the Cabinet of India